Sunshine Bay is a suburb Batemans Bay in Eurobodalla Shire, New South Wales, Australia. It lies on the Tasman Sea coast, about 6 km southeast of Batemans Bay and 285 km south of Sydney.

Sunshine Bay Public School was established in 1985.

References

Towns in New South Wales
Towns in the South Coast (New South Wales)
Eurobodalla Shire
Coastal towns in New South Wales